Beena is a 1978 Indian Malayalam film, directed by I. V Sasi and produced by Sheriff. The film stars Madhu, Sheela, Sudheer, K. P Ummer, Jayabharathi and Sathar in the lead roles. The film has a musical score by Kannur Rajan.

Cast
Madhu as Prof. Sreenivasan

Sheela as Beena
Jayabharathi as Dr.Shalini
K. P Ummer as Venu gopal
Sudheer as Ravi
Sathaar as Sharath Chandhran
Unnimary as Guest appearance in song kaakkatudilukal
Rajakokila as Malathy
 Master Reghu as Young Ravi

Soundtrack
The music was composed by Kannur Rajan and the lyrics were written by Bichu Thirumala and Appan Thacheth.

References

External links
 

1978 films
Films directed by I. V. Sasi
1970s Malayalam-language films